Kandana is a suburb of Colombo in Western Province, Sri Lanka,  north of the Colombo city centre. Due to the proximity to Colombo, Negombo as well as the Bandaranaike International Airport, the suburb is a popular residential area.
The neighboring suburbs are Ja-Ela, Ragama, Peralanda and Wattala.

Transport 
Kandana is situated on the A3 (Colombo - Negombo) Highway. 

Demographic 
The major ethnic group in Kandana are Sinhalese and most residents of Kandana are Roman Catholic. The St. Sebastian's Shrine in Kandana  is a well-known Roman Catholic place of worship. Many Catholic churches are situated in and around Kandana.
Historically, Kandana has had a large Burgher (Dutch, Portuguese and British ancestry) population, however, the number of Burghers has decreased throughout the years.

Industries 
Kandana is home to the Swadeshi Industrial Works, a leading soap manufacturing company established in 1941, as well as to many small scale industries. The town is also famous for its bakeries and restaurants.

Education 
 St. Sebastian's College Kandana
 De Mazenod College

References

Populated places in Western Province, Sri Lanka